Shern Hall Street was a railway station on the Chingford branch line located in Walthamstow.

The station was opened on 26 April 1870 as the terminus of a new single-track branch line from Lea Bridge junction on the Northern and Eastern Railway's original line from Stratford. This section is today referred to as the Temple Mills branch. The station had a short operational life and was closed on 17 November 1873 when the line was extended northwards to Chingford with a new station opening at Wood Street to the east as its replacement.

References

   
 

Disused railway stations in the London Borough of Waltham Forest
Former Great Eastern Railway stations
Railway stations in Great Britain opened in 1870
Railway stations in Great Britain closed in 1873